William Partridge is the name of:
William Ordway Partridge (1861–1930), American sculptor
William Partridge (New Hampshire official) (1654–1729), English colonial administrator
William Partridge (soldier) (1858–1930), British soldier
William Partridge (lacrosse), American lacrosse player
William Partridge (MP), Member of Parliament for Rochester
William Partridge (Irish revolutionary) (1874–1917), trade unionist and revolutionary socialist from Sligo, Ireland.